DWGA-TV (channel 2) is a television station in Sorsogon City, Philippines, airing programming from the GMA network. Owned and operated by the network's namesake corporate parent, the station maintains transmitter facilities atop Mt. Bintacan, Brgy. Maalo, Juban, Sorsogon.

Although identifying as a separate station in its own right, DWGA-TV is considered a straight simulcast of DWAI-TV (channel 7) in Naga City.

Prior to the acquisition by GMA in 2014, the station was originally owned by Intercontinental Broadcasting Corporation from 1995 to 1999.

History
 1995 - DWIB channel 2, signed on the airwaves for the first time under the government-owned Intercontinental Broadcasting Corporation, and was the first TV station to sign on in the Sorsogon area/province (before DWAW-TV by ABS-CBN).
 1999 - IBC 2 ceased operations due to lack of transmitting and advertising financial operations of programs.
 2014 - After 15 years of silence, Channel 2 signed-on again and a new callsign called DWGM-TV was used by GMA Network Inc., which is now Owning & Operating the frequency.
 November 10, 2014 - GMA Bicol launched its new flagship local newcast 24 Oras Bikol after it launched GMA Sorsogon.
 April 24, 2015 - GMA Network decided to cancel airing 24 Oras Bikol as part of the strategic streamlining undertaken by the network. The station is now downgraded as a relay (satellite-selling) station.
 2019 - GMA Sorsogon changed its callsign from the former DWGM-TV to DWGA-TV.
 February 1, 2021 - GMA Bicol is re-upgraded as an originating station with the relaunching of their regional newscast Balitang Bicolandia covering the following areas: Camarines Sur, Albay, Catanduanes, Sorsogon, Masbate and Camarines Norte.
 2022 - Mornings with GMA Regional TV was added to the program list of DWGA-TV, along with other regional GMA Bicol stations.

GMA TV-2 Sorsogon Programs
 Balitang Bicolandia - flagship afternoon newscast (simulcast on TV-7 Naga)
 Mornings with GMA Regional TV - flagship morning newscast (simulcast from GMA Dagupan)

References

See also
 DWAI-TV
 List of GMA Network stations

GMA Network stations
Television stations in Sorsogon
Television channels and stations established in 2014